The 2018–19 Maine Black Bears Men's ice hockey season was the 44th season of play for the program, the 42nd season competing at the Division I level, and the 35th season in the Hockey East conference. The Black Bears represented the University of Maine and played their home games at Alfond Arena, and were coached by Red Gendron, in his 6th season as their head coach.

Personnel

Head Coach: Red Gendron, 5th season

Assistant Coach: Ben Guite, 5th season

Assistant Coach: Alfie Michaud, 3rd season

Volunteer Assistant Coach: Colten St. Clair

Roster

As of March 10, 2018.

Standings

Schedule and Results

|-
!colspan=12 style=""| Exhibition

|-
!colspan=12 style=""| Regular Season

|-
!colspan=12 style=""| Hockey East Tournament

Rankings

References

Maine Black Bears men's ice hockey seasons
Maine Black Bears
Maine Black Bears
2018 in sports in Maine
2019 in sports in Maine